The 1947–48 season was the 33rd in the history of the Isthmian League, an English football competition.

Leytonstone were champions for the second season in a row, winning their fifth Isthmian League title.

League table

References

Isthmian League seasons
I